Anchor Point or anchor point may refer to:
Anchor Point, Alaska, US
Anchor Point, Newfoundland and Labrador, Canada
Anchor point (audio)